The New Democrat Network is an American think tank that promotes centrist candidates for the Democratic Party. NDN is a 501(c)(4) membership organization that functions in conjunction with its two subsidiary organizations, the NDN Political Fund, a non-federal political organization (527), and NDN PAC, a federal political action committee.

Founding
NDN is led and was founded by Simon Rosenberg in 1996, after his split with the Democratic Leadership Council (DLC), for which he worked. Before founding NDN, Rosenberg worked as a television news writer and producer and a political strategist for the Michael Dukakis and Bill Clinton presidential campaigns and the Democratic National Committee.
NDN has offices in Washington, D.C., New York City, San Francisco, and Miami.

Involvement in the 2004 presidential election
The NDN, while not supporting or embracing 2004 Democratic presidential primary candidate Howard Dean, has pointed to his online network of small donors, volunteers, and bloggers as the model to emulate for the Democratic Party. The NDN is now challenging the DLC and is becoming an increasingly influential player in the party's politics.

In the 2004 United States presidential election, NDN led an effort to turn out Hispanic voters for John Kerry. Also in 2004, Rosenberg announced his candidacy for Chairman of the Democratic National Committee, but eventually withdrew from the race, after it became clear that he would lose to eventual Chairman Howard Dean. Rosenberg then supported Dean's campaign.

See also
New Democrat Coalition
Third Way (United States)

References

External links
 Official website
 New Politics Institute website
 NDN's Hispanic Strategy Center website (2008)
 Opensecrets.org's summary of NDN's PAC contributions by cycle
 Report on NDN's spending by the Center for Public Integrity (2003)

501(c)(4) nonprofit organizations
527 organizations
Factions in the Democratic Party (United States)
Organizations established in 1996
Democratic Party (United States) organizations